"This Is Not Real Love" is the second single from George Michael's second greatest hits album Twenty Five. The single features Mutya Buena, the then ex-Sugababes member and was released on 6 November 2006. Due to the busy work schedules of both Michael and Buena, a video was made; however, it featured actors and scenes of the singers in the studio. The song was also featured in a remixed form on Mutya Buena's solo debut album Real Girl. The song peaked in 2006 at number fifteen in the United Kingdom. On 25 March 2008, it was released in the United States and reached number eight on the Hot Dance Club Songs chart. It sold 10,000 units in Italy.

Track listing
 UK CD single number one
 "This Is Not Real Love" (Main Mix) – 4:54
 "Edith & the Kingpin" (Live at Abbey Road Dec '04) – 3:40

 UK CD single number two
 "This Is Not Real Love" (Main Mix) – 4:54
 "Everything She Wants" (Remix) – 6:34
 "I'm Your Man" (Extended Stimulation Remix) – 6:52

 Mutya Buena promotional single
 "This Is Not Real Love" (Moto Blanco Mix) – 8:58
 "This Is Not Real Love" (Moto Blanco Dub) – 8:14

Charts

Weekly charts

References

External links
 Watch the video

2006 singles
2006 songs
George Michael songs
Mutya Buena songs
Songs written by George Michael
Song recordings produced by George Michael
Contemporary R&B ballads
Male–female vocal duets